N. K. Perumal was an Indian politician and former Member of the Legislative Assembly. He was elected to the Tamil Nadu legislative assembly as an Anna Dravida Munnetra Kazhagam candidate from Vilathikulam constituency in 2001 election.

References 

Dravida Munnetra Kazhagam politicians
Members of the Tamil Nadu Legislative Assembly
Year of birth missing
Possibly living people
All India Anna Dravida Munnetra Kazhagam politicians